Mercedes de Mendieta (born c. 1989) is an activist in Socialist Left (Argentina).

She became a member of the legislature of the Autonomous City of Buenos Aires in June 2021.

She has been involved in the campaign for legal, free and safe abortion.

References

Further information
video about her taking her seat (Spanish)
interview on Frecuencia Zero (Spanish)

Socialist Left (Argentina) politicians
Living people
1980s births
Argentine abortion-rights activists
Argentine feminists
Year of birth missing (living people)
Politicians from Buenos Aires